Mogens is a Danish masculine given name (specifically Danish shake-up of Magnus), and may refer to:

Mogens Ballin, Danish artist, one of a group of painters who gathered in the Breton village of Pont-Aven
Mogens Berg (born 1944), Danish former football player
Jens Mogens Boyesen (1920–1996), Norwegian diplomat and politician for the Labour Party
Mogens Brandt (1909–1970), Danish film actor
Mogens Camre (1936–2016), Danish politician and member of the European Parliament with the Danish People's Party
Mogens Christensen (1929–2020), Norwegian luger
Mogens Christiansen (born 1972), former Danish cricketer
Mogens Ellegaard (1935–1995), of Denmark, regarded as the "father of the classical accordion"
Mogens Bay Esbensen (born 1930), Danish born chef and author, introduced Thai cuisine and ingredients to Australia
Mogens Fog (1906–1990), Danish physician, politician (Danish Communist Party) and resistance fighter
Mogens Frey, retired Danish road bicycle racer
Mogens Glistrup (1926–2008), controversial Danish politician, lawyer, tax protester and member of the Danish parliament
Mogens Gøye (1470–1544), wealthy Danish statesman and Steward of the Realm
Mogens Guldberg (born 1963), former middle-distance runner from Denmark
Mogens Gyldenstierne (born 1481 or 1485), led the defense of Norway against King Christian II
Mogens Haastrup (born 1939), Danish former amateur football (soccer) player
Carsten Mogens Hansen (born 1957), Danish Social Democrat politician
Mogens Herman Hansen FBA (born 1940), Danish classical philologist and classical demographer
Mogens Winkel Holm (1936–1999), Danish composer
Mogens Jeppesen (born 1953), former Danish handball player
Mogens Jespersen (born 1949), Danish former football (soccer) player
Mogens Koch (1898–1993), Danish architect and furniture designer, professor at the Royal Danish Academy of Fine Arts
Mogens Krogh (born 1963), Danish retired professional football (soccer) player
Mogens Lassen (1901–1987), Modernist Danish architect and designer within the idiom of the International Style
Mogens Lüchow (1918–1989), Danish fencer
Mogens Lykketoft (born 1946), Danish politician, former government minister and current Speaker of the Folketing
Victor Mogens (1886–1964), Norwegian journalist, editor and politician for Fedrelandslaget
Mogens Dahl Nielsen (born 1972), former Danish cricketer
Mogens Pedersøn (1583–1623), Danish instrumentalist and composer
Mogens Rukov, Danish screenwriter
Mogens Schou (1918–2005), Danish psychiatrist, groundbreaking researcher into Lithium to treat bipolar illness
Mogens Skeel (1651–1694), Danish playwright
Mogens Thomassen (1914–1987), Danish field hockey player
Mogens Thorsen (1790–1863), Norwegian shipowner
Mogens Truelsen (1901–1979), Danish sprinter
Mogens Venge (1912–1996), Danish field hockey player
Mogens Wieth (1919–1962), Danish film actor
Mogens Wöldike (1897–1988), Danish conductor, choirmaster, organist, and scholar

See also
Mogensen

Danish masculine given names